City Exchange was a building that stood on Bay Street in Savannah, Georgia, United States, between 1799 and 1904. It replaced a previous structure which was destroyed by fire in 1796. The former seat of Savannah's city government, the building's location is now occupied by Savannah City Hall.

The building was the design of French architect and builder Adrian Boucher, who arrived from New York City in 1797, the year following the great fire of Savannah, to assist with the reconstruction of the city's important buildings.

The Exchange served both public and private interests until 1812, when the city purchased it for use as City Hall.

The building was renovated in 1854, including the addition of a portico. The architect was Savannah's Sholl & Fay.

In December 1864, Union Army General John W. Geary gave a speech in front of the building in which he congratulated his troops, who had captured "this most beautiful city of the South" during the Civil War.

In September 1896, the building was one of several that was damaged in a severe storm that passed through Savannah.

Bell
The building's bell, the oldest in Georgia, was constructed in 1802 and imported from Amsterdam. It hung in the bell tower of the Exchange from 1804 until the building's demolition. After being in the possession of Rourke Iron Works until 1940. It is now located in a replica of the tower, which was erected in 1957, in another location on East Bay Street. When it was in situ, the bell signalled the closing time for businesses. It was also rung by a watchman when fire broke out. It rang out in celebration of American victories during the War of 1812.

References 

1799 establishments in Georgia (U.S. state)
1904 disestablishments in Georgia (U.S. state)
Government buildings in Savannah, Georgia
Clock towers in Georgia (U.S. state)
Government buildings completed in 1799